The list of marine molluscs of Ireland is a list of marine species that form a part of the molluscan fauna of Ireland.

Their habitats include littoral, mesopelagic, pelagic, oceanic zone, benthic, deep ocean water and deep sea.

Class Aplacophora (worm-like molluscs)

Subclass Solenogastres

There were recorded at least 2 species of solenogastres in Ireland.

Family Rhopalomeniidae
 Rhopalomenia aglaopheniae (Kowalewsky & Marion, 1887)

Family Neomeniidae
Neomenia carinata Tullberg, 1875

Subclass Caudofoveata
There was recorded at least 1 species of Caudofoveata in Ireland.

Family Chaetodermatidae
Chaetoderma nitidulum Lovén, 1844

Class Polyplacophora (sea cradles, loricates)

There were recorded at least 13 species of polyplacophorans in Ireland.

Family Acanthochitonidae
Acanthochitona crinita (Pennant, 1777)
Acanthochitona discrepans (Brown, 1827)
Acanthochitona fascicularis (Linnaeus, 1767)

Family Ischnochitonidae
Lepidochitona cinerea (Linnaeus, 1767)
Tonicella marmorea (Fabricius, 1780)  
Tonicella rubra (Linnaeus, 1767)

Family Leptochitonidae
Callochiton achatinus (Brown, 1827)
Callochiton septemvalvis (Montagu, 1803)
Hanleya hanleyi (Bean in Thorpe, 1844)
Lepidopleurus asellus (Gmelin, 1791)
Lepidopleurus cancellatus (Sowerby, 1839)
Leptochiton asellus (Gmelin, 1791)
Leptochiton cancellatus (G. B. Sowerby II, 1840)

Class Gastropoda (slugs, snails etc.)

Class Bivalvia (clams, oysters, scallops, mussels)

Class Scaphopoda (tusk shells, tooth shells)
There were recorded at least 2 species of tusk shells in Ireland.

Family Dentaliidae
Antalis entalis  (Linnaeus, 1758)
Antalis vulgaris  (da Costa, 1778)

Class Cephalopoda (inkfish) 
There were recorded at least 5 species of cephalopods in Ireland.

Family Octopodidae (most octopuses)
Eledone cirrhosa  (Lamarck, 1798)  
Octopus vulgaris  Cuvier, 1797

Family Sepiolidae
Rossia macrosoma  (Delle Chiaje, 1829)
Sepiola atlantica d'Orbigny, 1839

Family Architeuthidae (giant squid)
Architeuthis dux Steenstrup, 1857

See also
 List of non-marine molluscs of Ireland

Lists of molluscs of surrounding countries:
 List of non-marine molluscs of Great Britain
 List of marine molluscs of Island

References

J.D. Nunn and J.M.C. Holmes A catalogue of the Irish and British marine Mollusca in the collections of the National Museum of Ireland ~ Natural History, 1835-2008
P. J. Hayward and J. S. Ryland Eds., 1999 The Marine Fauna of the British Isles and North-West Europe: Volume II: Molluscs to Chordates Oxford University Press 
Howson, C.M. & Picton, B.E.(eds) 1997. The species directory of the marine fauna and flora of the British Isles and surrounding seas.Ulster Museum and The Marine Conservation Society, Belfast and Ross-on-Wye.
 Gofas, S.; Le Renard, J.; Bouchet, P. (2001). Mollusca, in: Costello, M.J. et al. (Ed.) (2001). European register of marine species: a check-list of the marine species in Europe and a bibliography of guides to their identification. Collection Patrimoines Naturels, 50: pp. 180-213
Nunn, J.D.; Smith, S.M.; Picton, B.E.; McGrath, D. (2005). A checklist, atlas and bibliography for the marine Mollusca of Ireland, in: Wilson, J.G. (Ed.) The intertidal ecosystem: the value of Ireland’s shores. pp. 200-201
Identification
Pruvot-Fol A., 1954  Mollusques Opisthobranches. Faune de France n° 58  460 p., 1 pl., 173 fig. PDF (21 Mo)

External links

Bernard E. Picton and Christine C. Morrow Encyclopedia of Marine Life of Britain and Ireland
MarLIN Marine Life Information Network for Britain and Ireland.
 Roche C., Clarke S. & O’Connor B. (2005) Inventory of Irish marine wildlife publications. Irish Wildlife Manuals, No. 16. National Parks and Wildlife Service,Department of Environment, Heritage and Local Government, Dublin, Ireland.
 World Register of Marine Species
The Conchological Society of Great Britain and Ireland Encyclopedia image browse and species index
Marine species identification portal
Natural History Museum Rotterdam Mollusca Images

Fauna of Ireland
Ireland